Oldenzaal (Tweants: Oldnzel) is a municipality and a city in the eastern province of Overijssel in the Netherlands. It is part of the region of Twente and is close to the German border.

It received city rights in 1249. Historically, the city was part of the Hanseatic League as a subsidiary city of the fellow Hanseatic city of Deventer.

Located on the A1 motorway from Amsterdam to Germany, Oldenzaal also has a rail connection to Hengelo and Bad Bentheim. 

As of 1 January 2019, 31,885 people lived in Oldenzaal.

In the Netherlands, Oldenzaal is well known for its carnival festivities. During the carnival season Oldenzaal is known as "Boeskool-stad" which is a local dialect of the word Cabbage-town. During the main carnival weekend over 100,000 people come for the big parade showing high and mighty carnival trucks.

Transportation
The town is served by the Oldenzaal railway station.

Notable residents
 Balderic of Utrecht (897–975) Bishop of Utrecht, 918 to 975
 Henri Max Corwin (1903–1962) a Dutch businessman, philatelist and humanitarian; shielded Jewish victims of the Nazis in WWII
 Mieke Telkamp (1934–2016) a Dutch singer and TV personality
 Hedy de Graas (born 1988) artist name: 'Ame Bibabi', a Dutch rapper and an internet personality

Sport 
 Theo Pahlplatz (born 1947) a Dutch retired footballer; 468 caps with FC Twente 
 Wilfried Brookhuis (born 1961) a retired football goalkeeper with 404 club caps
 Raimond van der Gouw (born 1963) a Dutch former football goalkeeper with 493 club caps
 Ellen van Langen (born 1966) a Dutch former middle-distance runner, gold medallist in the 800 m. at the 1992 Summer Olympics 
 Rudie Kemna (born 1967) a former Dutch racing cyclist
 Björn Kuipers (born 1973) a Dutch FIFA listed football referee
 Jan Vennegoor of Hesselink (born 1978) a Dutch former footballer with 438 club caps
 Tim Breukers (born 1987) a Dutch professional footballer with over 250 club caps 
 Wout Droste (born 1989) a Dutch professional footballer with over 250 club caps
 Nathalie Timmermans (born 1989) a Dutch softball player, competed in the 2008 Summer Olympics
 Jules Reimerink (born 1989) a Dutch professional footballer with over 250 club caps 
 Alexander Bannink (born 1990) a Dutch professional footballer with over 220 club caps
 Sanne Wevers (born 1991) a Dutch artistic gymnast, gold medallist at the 2016 Summer Olympics
 Lieke Wevers (born 1991) a Dutch artistic gymnast, won four medals at the 2015 European Games
 Jill Roord (born 1997) a Dutch midfield footballer
 Erik ten Hag (born 1970) former footballer with 336 club caps and coach. Current head coach for Manchester United

Gallery

References

External links

Official website

 
Cities in the Netherlands
Members of the Hanseatic League
Municipalities of Overijssel
Populated places in Overijssel
Twente